The Spiral Bureau is a 1976 Australian television film directed by Ian Coughlan and starring Peter Sumner, Wendy Hughes, and John Derum. The screenplay concerns three psychic researchers.

References

External links

Australian television films
1976 television films
1976 films
1970s English-language films
1970s Australian films